Posani is an Indian surname. Notable people with the surname include:

 Posani Krishna Murali (born 1958), Indian screenwriter, actor, director, and producer
 Sudheer Babu born as Posani Naga Sudheer Babu (born 1980), Indian actor and badminton player

Indian surnames